Filmpje! ("Little Film!") is a 1995 Dutch comedy film directed by Paul Ruven. It stars Dutch TV presenter and comedian Paul de Leeuw as two of his characters, Bob de Rooy and his wife Annie de Rooy, which were both featured in a lot of his TV sketches. Just like De Leeuw's TV shows the film is full of controversial comedy about taboo subjects. It was the most popular Dutch film of the year.

Plot
Bob de Rooy is an arrogant, egotistical man who divorces his well-meaning, but very naïve wife Annie, because she's unable to provide him the right amount of sex in their married life. After the divorce is settled, Bob goes to the red light district in Amsterdam to catch up what he has been missing all those years. There he starts an affair with a prostitute who turns out to be the daughter of gangster boss Don Gorgonzola. When the criminal boss finds out that his daughter has an affair with Bob, who arrogantly makes fun of him on the phone and hangs up before he does, Bob and his newfound love have to flee to Curaçao. Meanwhile, Annie falls in love three times, first with a notorious criminal who is later shot by one of Gorgonzola's henchmen, then with a man who dies of cancer and later one of Gorgonzola's henchmen who exploits Annie's innocence to let her smuggle drugs to Curaçao. There Annie and Bob meet again...

Cast
Paul de Leeuw	... 	Bob de Rooy / Annie de Rooy
Rijk de Gooyer	... 	Don Gorgonzola (as Rijk de Gooijer)
Olga Zuiderhoek	... 	Carmen
Tom Jansen	... 	Brie
Arjan Ederveen	... 	Charl Diepenhoef
Porgy Franssen	... 	Rocky Fort
Roos Ouwehand	... 	Marie Louise de Rooy
Coen van Vlijmen	... 	Albert de Rooy
Kees Groenteman	... 	Marcel de Rooy
IJf Blokker	... 	Piet Buks
Wil van der Meer	... 	Gekke Gerrit (as Will van der Meer)
Peer Mascini	... 	Joop Rooster
Willeke Alberti	... 	Toos Rooster
Pleuni Touw	... 	Mevrouw Lozig
Bram van der Vlugt	... 	Dokter Lozig

References

External links 
 

Dutch comedy films
Dutch crime comedy films
Dutch satirical films
Films set in the Netherlands
Films shot in the Netherlands
Netherlands in fiction
Films about prostitution in the Netherlands
Mafia films
Films about dysfunctional families
Curaçao in fiction
Films set in Curaçao
Films shot in Curaçao
1995 films
1990s Dutch-language films
1990s crime comedy films
Self-reflexive films
Films based on television series
1995 comedy films